Patrick Lodoi Mutono (born 17 March 1960) is a politician and physician based in Eastern Uganda. He is the founder of Lodoi Development Fund, which to date has built Kanginima Hospital (Pallisa), and orchestrated the construction of 400 clean water well sites in Eastern Uganda.  As of 2013, he was a Member of Parliament for Butebo County. In 2021 he was re elected to serve as member of parliament.

References

Living people
1960 births
20th-century Ugandan physicians
Members of the Parliament of Uganda
National Resistance Movement politicians
21st-century Ugandan physicians
21st-century Ugandan politicians